An Old-Fashioned Young Man is a 1917 American silent drama film directed by Lloyd Ingraham and starring Robert Harron and Colleen Moore. The role was  Moore's second credited film appearance and the first lead role of her career.

Story
Frank Trent (Harron), a young man, goes into politics, but the people he works with are using dirty tricks to defeat Mrs. Burke, the candidate for mayor. They insist her adopted daughter, Margaret (Moore), is her own through an illicit affair. The story angers the chivalrous Frank, who is in love with Margaret, and decides to disprove it, travelling to find proof of her legitimate birth. He is dogged by scoundrels along the way. He learns his own father is actually Mrs. Burke's husband, who abandoned her year earlier believing her to be unfaithful. Frank finds the diary of a long dead doctor, which proves that Margaret's mother is not Mrs. Burke. Frank and Margaret are united and Mrs. Burke wins the election.

Cast
 Robert Harron - Frank Trent
 Thomas Jefferson - James Trent, also known as James D. Burke	
 Loyola O'Connor - Mrs. James D. Burke	
 Colleen Moore - Margaret
 Adele Clifton - Nina Marquise	
 Charles Lee - Charles Murdock
 Wilbur Higby - Senator Briggs
 Winifred Westover - Mame Morton
 Alberta Lee - The Housekeeper
 Sam De Grasse - Harold T. King
 Bert Hadley - His agent
 Tom Wilson - Dan Morton

Production notes
An Old-Fashioned Young Man was produced by D. W. Griffith's Fine Arts Company and distributed by Triangle Film Corporation.

References

External links

1917 drama films
1917 films
Silent American drama films
American silent feature films
American black-and-white films
Films based on short fiction
Films directed by Lloyd Ingraham
Triangle Film Corporation films
1910s American films